Self-titled Album is an album by the Huntingtons released in 2003 on the Fast Music label. It features "Pittsburgh" which was played during a televised professional baseball game.

Track listing
 "Cut Me Loose"
 "3 Chord Baby"
 "I've Been Waiting"
 "I Just Want to Feel Alive"
 "Pittsburgh"
 "Kiss Your World Goodbye"
 "Maybe It's You"
 "Untitled 2"
 "Postcard"
 "What I'm Doing Wrong"
 "The Sound (Of Inevitability)"

All songs written by Huntingtons.

Personnel
Rick Wise – drums, percussion, programming
Josh Blackway – electric guitar, acoustic guitar
Tom Giachero – electric guitar
Mike Holt – vocals, bass guitar, electric guitar

Additional musicians
Stephen Mark Sarro – additional vocals
Gina Lardani – additional vocals on track 4, piano on track 11
Jenn Holt – additional vocals on track 4

References 

The Huntingtons albums
2003 albums